Daoukro Department is a department of Iffou Region in Lacs District, Ivory Coast. In 2021, its population was 148,095 and its seat is the settlement of Daoukro. The sub-prefectures of the department are Daoukro, Ettrokro, N'Gattakro, and Samanza.

History
Daoukro Department was created in 1988 as a first-level subdivision via a split-off from Dimbokro Department.

In 1997, regions were introduced as new first-level subdivisions of Ivory Coast; as a result, all departments were converted into second-level subdivisions. Daoukro Department was included in N'Zi-Comoé Region.

In 2011, districts were introduced as new first-level subdivisions of Ivory Coast. At the same time, regions were reorganised and became second-level subdivisions and all departments were converted into third-level subdivisions. At this time, Daoukro Department became part of Iffou Region in Lacs District.

In 2020, its northwestern part (sub-prefectures of Akpassanou, Ananda, and Ouellé) is taken apart to create the department of Ouellé.

Notes

Departments of Iffou
1988 establishments in Ivory Coast
States and territories established in 1988